Metalectra is a genus of moths of the family Erebidae described by Jacob Hübner in 1823.

Taxonomy
The genus has previously been classified in the subfamily Catocalinae within the families Erebidae and Noctuidae.

Species
 Metalectra albilinea Richards, 1941
 Metalectra bigallis J.B. Smith, 1908
 Metalectra cinctus J.B. Smith, 1905 (sometimes spelled Metalectra cincta)
 Metalectra diabolica Barnes & Benjamin, 1924 – diabolical fungus moth
 Metalectra discalis Grote, 1876 – common fungus moth
 Metalectra edilis J.B. Smith, 1906
 Metalectra geminicincta Schaus, 1916
 Metalectra miserulata Grote, 1882
 Metalectra quadrisignata Walker, 1858 – four-spotted fungus moth
 Metalectra richardsi Brower, 1941 – Richards' fungus moth
 Metalectra tantillus Grote, 1875 – black fungus moth

References

Boletobiinae
Noctuoidea genera